The 1893–94 season was the 23rd season of competitive football in England.

Events

Aston Villa won their first top-flight league title, beating Sunderland by 6 points. Villa's captain John Devey was the league's top-goal scorer with 20 goals.

The 1893–94 season saw four of the most famous teams in English footballing history join the Second Division: Liverpool, Newcastle United, Manchester City, and the first team based in London, Woolwich Arsenal (later Arsenal). Other teams to join the expanded Second Division of 15 teams were Middlesbrough Ironopolis and Rotherham Town. Middlesbrough Ironopolis disbanded at the end of the season, having only completed one season in the Football League.

Liverpool had the most successful season of all the new league clubs, winning the Second Division title and sealing promotion to the First Division by beating Newton Heath in the relegation/promotion test match.

National team

Ireland
England took a team of professionals to Belfast for the 1894 British Home Championship against Ireland on 3 March 1894.

Joe Reader (West Bromwich Albion) made his solitary England appearance in goal, whilst Henry Chippendale (Blackburn Rovers) earned his single cap at outside right, with his club team-mate Jimmy Whitehead earning his second, and last, cap alongside him. The other débutante was Jimmy Crabtree of Burnley at full-back, who went on to play a total of 14 games for England over the next 8 years. The remainder of the team were experienced internationals, including three members of Aston Villa's championship winning team (Jack Reynolds, John Devey and Dennis Hodgetts) and were expected to secure a comfortable victory.

Despite losing Robert Holmes with an injury after 20 minutes, England took a 2–0 lead by the 55th minute with goals from John Devey and Fred Spiksley. Ireland rallied, however, and with goals in the 70th and 87th minutes, pegged England back to a 2–2 draw.

Wales

For the match against Wales at Wrexham on 12 March 1894 the selectors decided to field a team consisting entirely of players with Corinthian connections, including three players making their international début. Lewis Vaughan Lodge (Cambridge University) made the first of five appearances at right back; Lodge was an accomplished county cricketer with Hampshire and Durham. Arthur Topham (Casuals), a schoolteacher who had gained a University of Oxford blue, made his solitary England appearance at left half, whilst his brother, Robert made his second, and final, appearance at outside right. The third débutante was John Veitch of Old Westminsters, who played at centre forward.

Wales opened the scoring after 10 minutes, but by half-time England had taken the lead with a goal from John Veitch and an own goal from Everton's Charlie Parry. Veitch scored again early in the second half and completed his hat-trick in the 80th minute, thus joining a select band to score a hat-trick on his début. The fifth goal came from Robert Cunliffe Gosling as England ran out comfortable 5–1 victors.

Scotland

The final match of the 1894 British Home Championship was against Scotland on 7 April 1894. England needed to secure a victory in order to retain the Championship for the fifth consecutive year. The match was played at Celtic Park, Glasgow and attracted a world record attendance for a full International of 45,107. The selectors chose an experienced eleven, with the only newcomer being Ernest Needham, the hard-tackling Sheffield United half back; "Nudger" Needham went on to make 16 England appearances over the next 8 years.

Scotland opened the scoring after 7 minutes, with a quick reply coming from John Goodall. England managed to keep the Scottish forwards at bay until the 75-minute, when Sandy McMahon was able to get through the England defence. (In 1901, McMahon was one of two players to put four goals past Ireland in an 11–0 victory for the Scots.) England equalized through Jack Reynolds with five minutes remaining and managed to hold on for a 2–2 draw.

The result meant that Scotland won the British Home Championship for the fifth time outright – plus two shared with England.

* England score given first

Key
 A = Home match
 BHC = British Home Championship

Honours

Notes = Number in parentheses is the times that club has won that honour. * indicates new record for competition

League table

First Division

Second Division

Test Match results

Footnotes

References

Details of Ireland v England game
Details of Wales v England game
Details of Scotland v England game
British Home Championship results on RSSF